The following highways are numbered 566:

United States